Jorge Emmanuel Torres Nilo (born 16 January 1988), also known as Pechu, is a Mexican professional footballer who plays as a left-back for Liga MX club Toluca.

Club career

Atlas
Torres Nilo started his football career at Atlas, where he was used in the club's youth team Academicos in the second division. Shortly after he made his professional debut under coach Daniel Guzmán on 25 February 2006 against Tecos UAG, coming in as a substitute for Rafael García Torres in the 85th minute of the match, which ended in a 4–0 victory for Atlas. Torres Nilo participated in the 2008 Copa Libertadores tournament with Atlas, where he played in their six group matches and scored one goal, against Boca Juniors in the first leg of the quarter-finals.

In 2010 it was announced Jorge Torres Nilo would be sold to Tigres UANL for the Apertura 2010 tournament.

UANL
On 27 May 2010, Torres Nilo was sold to Tigres UANL. He made his debut with Tigres on 21 August 2010 in a home game against Santos Laguna the match ended in a 1–0 victory. He did not debut until the 5th week of the Apertura 2010 season. Torres Nilo was named best defender of the Apertura 2011 season alongside teammate Hugo Ayala and has captured the eyes of many European teams, among them CSKA Moscow, and the Olympique de Marseille.

International career

Youth
In 2005 Coach Jesús Ramírez selected Torres Nilo to participate in the 2005 CONCACAF U17 Tournament held in Culiacán. in that tournament he played 2 matches against Canada, and Haiti. Torres Nilo did not make the final roster for those participating in the 2005 FIFA U-17 World Cup in which Mexico would win its first youth world cup.

In 2007 Coach René Isidoro García selected Jorge Torres Nilo to participate in the 2007 Pan American Games held in Rio de Janeiro. Mexico won Bronze after defeating Bolivia in the 3rd place match. Jorge Torres Nilo also participated in the 2007 Digicel Shield with Mexico U-23, he only played in the final against Trinidad and Tobago in which Mexico would receive second place after losing 2–1 in the final.

Torres-Nilo was called up as one of the 3 (overage players to represent Mexico U23 at the 2016 Summer Olympics held in Rio de Janeiro, Brazil.

Senior
Torres Nilo made his senior national team debut 24 September 2008 under coach Sven-Göran Eriksson in a friendly game against Chile in the Los Angeles Memorial Coliseum, the game ended in a 0–1 defeat for Mexico. after an own goal from Juan Carlos Valenzuela. After a year of inactivity with Mexico Torres Nilo was called by coach Javier Aguirre in 2010 to play in friendly games in preparation for the World Cup, Torres Nilo would make the final cut for those participating in the 2010 FIFA World Cup. Jorge Torres Nilo did not appear in any world cup matches. He scored his first goal for Mexico on 28 May 2011 in a friendly game against Ecuador in Seattle, he gave Mexico a 1–0 lead. The match ended in a 1–1 draw. Torres Nilo participated in the 2011 CONCACAF Gold Cup in which Mexico won the title after defeating United States in the final. Torres Nilo participated in the 2013 FIFA Confederations Cup held in Brazil and played 2 matches.

Career statistics

International

International goals
Scores and results list Mexico's goal tally first.

Honours
Tigres UANL
Liga MX: Apertura 2011, Apertura 2015, Apertura 2016, Apertura 2017, Clausura 2019
Copa MX: Clausura 2014
Campeón de Campeones: 2016, 2017, 2018
CONCACAF Champions League: 2020
Campeones Cup: 2018

Mexico U23
Pan American Bronze Medal: 2007

Mexico
CONCACAF Gold Cup: 2011, 2015
CONCACAF Cup: 2015

Individual
Mexican Primera División Full-back of the Tournament: Apertura 2011

References

External links
 
 
 
 
 
 
 Profile at Kimozabi.com 

1988 births
Living people
Association football fullbacks
Footballers from Baja California
Mexico youth international footballers
Mexico international footballers
Atlas F.C. footballers
Tigres UANL footballers
Deportivo Toluca F.C. players
2010 FIFA World Cup players
2011 CONCACAF Gold Cup players
2013 FIFA Confederations Cup players
2015 CONCACAF Gold Cup players
Copa América Centenario players
CONCACAF Gold Cup-winning players
Sportspeople from Tijuana
Liga MX players
Pan American Games bronze medalists for Mexico
Pan American Games medalists in football
Footballers at the 2016 Summer Olympics
Olympic footballers of Mexico
Mexican footballers
Footballers at the 2007 Pan American Games
Medalists at the 2007 Pan American Games